AFI Cotroceni  is a shopping mall in Bucharest, Romania. It is located in the western part of the city, between the city center and two of the largest residential districts, Militari and Drumul Taberei.

Events
In September 2016 the final tournament of the 2016 FIBA Europe 3x3 Championships, the European Championships of 3x3 basketball, was contested within the shopping centre.

References

External links

 AFI Cotroceni Official Site 

Shopping malls in Bucharest
Basketball venues in Romania